The 1996–97 Ulster Rugby season was Ulster's second season under professionalism, during which they competed in the IRFU Interprovincial Championship and the Heineken Cup.

In June 1996, Ulster hired former Leicester Tigers coach Tony Russ on a five-year contract as their Director of Rugby. He would coach the Ulster senior team, organise strategy, and help develop the game from schools to senior level, working closely with IRFU Director of Rugby Ray Southam.

At this stage the Irish provinces were still representative teams, not professional clubs. However, Ulster were now offering contracts and match fees for Heineken Cup and Interprovincial matches, although these contracts sometimes conflicted with players contracted to clubs in England. Meanwhile, clubs in England and Wales were unhappy at having to compete against representative teams from Ireland in the Heineken Cup. Out-half David Humphreys and lock Jeremy Davidson defied their club, London Irish, by competing in the Heineken Cup for Ulster, but were unavailable for Ulster's match against Australia as it clashed with London Irish's league match against Wasps. In Humphreys' absence, Ulster called on former Scotland "A" international Stuart Laing.

In November, Russ quit to join English second division club Waterloo F.C., unhappy that after eight games, he would not be able to work with his Ulster players again for six months. Clive Griffiths was lined up to take over, but withdrew for family reasons. Davy Haslett, a geography teacher at Royal Belfast Academical Institution and assistant coach on the 1997 Ireland A rugby union tour of Oceania, was named as coach for the 1997–98 season in June.

Ulster players selected for Ireland for the 1997 Five Nations Championship were: Jonny Bell, Allen Clarke, Jeremy Davidson, Maurice Field, David Humphreys, Paddy Johns, Denis McBride and James Topping. Jeremy Davidson was selected for the 1997 British Lions tour to South Africa.

Players selected

1996–97 Heineken Cup

Pool 3

1996–97 IRFU Interprovincial Championship

Top three teams qualify for next season's Heineken Cup.

Friendlies

References

1996-97
1996–97 in Irish rugby union
1996–97 Heineken Cup